St. Sebastian Church, Madathattuvilai is a Catholic Church located at Kanyakumari, Tamil Nadu, India. This church is famous for eye donation, with the help of the church youth group the church manages it in an organised manner around its village and nearby villages.

References

External links
St.Sebastian Church, Madathattuvilai Official Website

Roman Catholic shrines
Roman Catholic churches in Tamil Nadu
Roman Catholic cathedrals in Tamil Nadu
Churches in Kanyakumari district
1544 establishments in India